There are many relations among the uniform polyhedra. This List of uniform polyhedra by spherical triangle groups them by the Wythoff symbol.

Key

The vertex figure can be discovered by considering the Wythoff symbol:
 p|q r - 2p edges, alternating q-gons and r-gons. Vertex figure (q.r)p.
 p|q 2 - p edges, q-gons (here r=2 so the r-gons are degenerate lines).
 2|q r - 4 edges, alternating q-gons and r-gons
 q r|p - 4 edges, 2p-gons, q-gons, 2p-gons r-gons, Vertex figure 2p.q.2p.r.
 q 2|p - 3 edges, 2p-gons, q-gons, 2p-gons, Vertex figure 2p.q.2p.
 p q r|- 3 edges, 2p-gons, 2q-gons, 2r-gons, vertex figure 2p.2q.2r

Convex

Non-convex

a b 2

3 3 2 
 Group

4 3 2
 Group

5 3 2
 Group

5 5 2
 Group

a b 3

3 3 3
 Group

4 3 3
 Group

5 3 3
 Group

4 4 3
 Group

5 5 3
 Group

a b 5

5 5 5
 Group

Uniform polyhedra